Walter Reade (1884–1952) was an American film distributor and producer. 

Walter Reade may also refer to:
Walter Reade Theater, a film society in New York City

See also
Walter Read (disambiguation)
Walter Reed (disambiguation)
Walter Reid (disambiguation)